Serenity Chasma is the unofficial name given to a large pull-apart fault on Pluto's moon, Charon. It is part of a series of faults that run along the perimeter of Vulcan Planum. It was discovered by the New Horizons mission, and informally named after the fictitious spaceship, Serenity.

Geology
The northern wall continues for an additional  as a scarp after exiting the chasma. The chasma is part of a global tectonic belt; a series of canyons, scarps, and troughs that traverse the face of Charon. This series of faults is the longest known in the solar system.

Serenity Chasma formed as the result of a subsurface ocean on Charon, which expanded as it froze. This expansion pushed the Oz Terra region higher and produced the fault belt across Charon's equatorial region. 

Landslides have been observed within Serenity Chasma. This is the only known occurrence of landslides in the Kuiper Belt.

The lower portion of the Image shows colour-coded topography of the same scene Measurements of the shape of this feature tell scientists that Charon's Water ice layer  may have at least partially liquid in its early history

See also
 List of geological features on Charon

References

New Horizons